DWTY (93.5 FM), broadcasting as 93.5 Brigada News FM, is a radio station owned and operated by Brigada Mass Media Corporation in the Philippines. Its studios are located at the 2nd floor, Agabao Building, 19th Arthur St., Brgy. West Bajac-Bajac, Olongapo, while its transmitter is located at Kalaklan Ridge, Olongapo.

It was formerly the flagship station of Baycomms Broadcasting Corporation under the brand Bay Radio from April 1992 to Brigada's acquisition in 2013. Brigada News FM Olongapo officially signed on last April 2015, carrying local programming and hook-up shows with Brigada News FM National-Makati.

References

External links
Brigada News FM Olongapo FB Page
Brigada News FM Olongapo Website

Radio stations in Olongapo
OPM formatted radio stations in the Philippines
Radio stations established in 1998